Sword Fishing is a 1939 short documentary film. In 1940, it was nominated for an Academy Award for Best Live Action Short Film, One-Reel at the 12th Academy Awards. It is narrated by Ronald Reagan.

Cast
 Howard Hill as himself
 Ronald Reagan as the narrator

See also
 Ronald Reagan filmography

References

External links

Sword Fishing

1939 films
American short documentary films
Warner Bros. short films
American black-and-white films
Films about fishing
1939 documentary films
Black-and-white documentary films
1930s short documentary films
1930s English-language films
1930s American films